The Port Largo Seaplane Base  is a sea plane base located  southwest of Key Largo in Monroe County, Florida, United States.

References

External links
 

Airports in Monroe County, Florida
Seaplane bases in the United States